Illabo Shire was a local government area in the Riverina region of New South Wales, Australia.

Illabo Shire was proclaimed on 7 March 1906. Its offices were based in the town of Junee.

The Local Government Areas Amalgamation Act 1980 saw the amalgamation of Illabo Shire with the Municipality of Junee to form Junee Shire on 1 January 1981.

References

Former local government areas of New South Wales
1906 establishments in Australia
1981 disestablishments in Australia